Richard William Roberts Ogden MBE (14 December 1919 - 14 October 2005), was a British jeweller, the third generation of his family in the high-end London trade.

Early life
He was born in Harrogate, the son of William Ogden who was also a jeweller, with a shop in King Street, St James's. His grandfather James R Ogden, started a jewellery business in Harrogate in 1893, and later moved to London, where he had premises in Duke Street, St James's.

He was educated at Harrow School, and served in military intelligence in Burma during the Second World War, rising to Major, awarded an MBE and mentioned three times in dispatches.

Career
In 1947, he opened a shop in Prince's Arcade, and moved to Burlington Arcade in 1951. Customers have included Cary Grant, Charlie Chaplin, Ingrid Bergman, Jack Hawkins, Claire Bloom, Audrey Hepburn, and Madonna.

Personal life
Ogden married Jenny Tencate in 1946, and they had two sons and a daughter. The marriage was dissolved in 1958, and in 1960 he married Phyllis Dawson, gaining a stepson and two stepdaughters. His eldest son, Robert Ogden runs the business, still in Burlington Arcade.

References

1919 births
2005 deaths
People educated at Harrow School
British jewellers
Members of the Order of the British Empire